A list of Spanish-produced and co-produced feature films scheduled for release in Spain in 2023 and beyond. When applicable, the domestic theatrical release date is favoured.

Films

Box office 
As of 12 March 2023, the ten highest-grossing Spanish films in 2023, by in-year domestic box office gross revenue, are as follows:

See also
 List of Spanish films — Spanish films by year
 List of 2023 box office number-one films in Spain

References
Informational notes

Citations

Spanish
2023
Films